Wide Bay may refer to:
Wide Bay, Papua New Guinea, a bay in New Britain
Wide Bay (Queensland), a bay in Australia
Division of Wide Bay, an Australian Electoral Division in Queensland 
Electoral district of Wide Bay, a former electorate of the Legislative Assembly of Queensland
Wide Bay–Burnett, a geographic region in Queensland
Auswide Bank formerly Wide Bay Bank